There are 67 Grade I listed buildings in Cambridge, England. In the United Kingdom, a listed building is a building or structure of special historical or architectural importance. These buildings are legally protected from demolition, as well as from any extensions or alterations that would adversely affect the building's character or destroy historic features. Listed buildings in England are divided into three categories—Grade II buildings are buildings of special interest; Grade II* buildings are Grade II buildings of particular interest; and Grade I buildings, which are those of "exceptional" interest. Only around two per cent of listed buildings are given Grade I status.

Cambridge is a university town located in East Anglia, England. It is home to the University of Cambridge, founded in 1209, and many of the listed buildings are part of the university or its constituent colleges.

St Bene't's Church is the oldest surviving building in the city, dating back to the 11th century. The oldest secular building is the School of Pythagoras, built around 1200 and now a part of St John's college. Both of these are Grade I listed.

List 

|}

See also
 Grade II* listed buildings in Cambridge

Notes

References

External links

 
Lists of Grade I listed buildings in Cambridgeshire